Roy Thomas Baker (born 10 November 1946) is an English record producer, songwriter and arranger, who has produced rock and pop and songs since the 1970s.

Career
Baker began his career at Decca Records at the age of 14 and later worked as an assistant engineer at Morgan Studios. Encouraged by music producer Gus Dudgeon, he soon moved to Trident Studios, where he worked with Dudgeon, Tony Visconti, Mick Jagger and Keith Richards, and Frank Zappa, as well as recording artists such as The Rolling Stones, David Bowie, The Who, Gasolin', Nazareth, Santana, The Mothers of Invention, Jet, Be Bop Deluxe, Free and T. Rex.

After co-founding Neptune (Trident's record company), Baker met the rock band Queen. He began a working relationship that lasted for five albums (Queen, Queen II, Sheer Heart Attack, A Night at the Opera and Jazz) and a number of awards – including Grammy Awards and the Guinness World Records for the best hit song, "Bohemian Rhapsody".

Following his successes with Queen and other artists, Baker signed a multi-album production deal with CBS Music (Columbia Records, Sony Music, Epic Records, etc.). He then proceeded to move to the US and set up the RTB Audio Visual Productions' Offices in New York and Los Angeles. At this time under his new CBS deal RTB produced Journey, Starcastle, Reggie Knighton (The Grass Roots), Ian Hunter and Ronnie Wood (The Rolling Stones).

Baker, also at this time, committed to produce four albums for The Cars after being prompted by Elektra Records to see them perform in a Boston school gymnasium. The albums were certified platinum and The Cars were Grammy-nominated.

He was offered the post as the Senior Vice-President of "Artist and Repertoire" (A&R) for Elektra Records as executive and/or producer with recording artists Lindsey Buckingham, Mötley Crüe, Joe Lynn Turner, Josie Cotton and Dokken as well as continuing with Queen and The Cars. During his tenure, Elektra signed artists Metallica, Simply Red, Yello, Peter Schilling, The World and 10,000 Maniacs.

Baker has also worked with artists Guns N' Roses, Alice Cooper, Foreigner, Pilot, Ozzy Osbourne, Devo, The Stranglers, Dusty Springfield, T'Pau, Local H, Cheap Trick and Lewis Furey. In 2005, he produced One Way Ticket to Hell and Back by The Darkness, The Smashing Pumpkins' 2007 album, Zeitgeist, The Storm's 2008 album When the Storm Meets the Ground, The Smashing Pumpkins' American Gothic and One Karma's 2011 album Life Got in the Way. He also produced Yes's 2014 album Heaven & Earth, 35 years after his previous experience with the band, working on sessions in Paris that did not lead to an album.

Discography
Productions by Roy Thomas Baker:

Arnold Corns: "Man in the Middle" (1971 – released 1985)
Free: Fire and Water (1970)
Nazareth: Nazareth (engineer) (1971)
Nazareth: Exercises (1972)
Gasolin': Gasolin' 3 (1973)
Gasolin': Stakkels Jim (in English: "Poor Jim") (1974)
Queen: Queen (1973) (Credited as Roy Baker)
Queen: Queen II (1974)
Hawkwind: Hall of the Mountain Grill (1974)
Robert Calvert: Captain Lockheed and the Starfighters (1974)
Man :  Rhinos, Winos and Lunatics (1974)
The Trammps: ‘’The Legendary Zing Album’’ (1975)
Queen: Sheer Heart Attack (1974)
Queen: A Night at the Opera (1975)
Jet: Jet (1975)
Be-Bop Deluxe: Futurama (1975)
Gasolin': Gas 5 (1975)
Lewis Furey: The Humours Of (1976)
Pilot: Morin Heights (1976)
Ian Hunter: Overnight Angels (1976)
Gasolin': Efter endnu en dag (1976)
Starcastle: Fountains of Light (1977)
Starcastle: Citadel (1977)
Dusty Springfield It Begins Again (1978)
The Cars: The Cars (1978)
Queen: Jazz (1978)
Journey: Infinity (1978)
Journey: Evolution (1979)
Yes: Paris Sessions aka Golden Age Sessions (1979; unreleased)
Ron Wood: Gimme Some Neck (1979)
The Cars: Candy-O (1979)
Foreigner: Head Games (1979)
Alice Cooper: Flush the Fashion (1980)
The Cars: Panorama (1980)
The Cars: Shake It Up (1981)
Heavy Metal: "Motion Picture Soundtrack" (1982)
Cheap Trick: One on One (1982)
Devo: Oh, No! It's Devo (1982)
Fast Times at Ridgemont High: Motion Picture Soundtrack (1982)
Mötley Crüe: Too Fast for Love (1982)
Espionage: "Espionage" (1983)
Joe Lynn Turner: Rescue You (1985)
Jon Anderson: 3 Ships (1985)
American Anthem: "Motion Picture Soundtrack" (1986)
T'Pau: Bridge of Spies (titled T'Pau in the US) (1987)
Slade: You Boyz Make Big Noize (1987)
Ozzy Osbourne: No Rest for the Wicked (1988)
The Stranglers: 10 (1989)
Chris de Burgh: Spark to a Flame (1990)
Shy: Misspent Youth (1990)
Dangerous Toys: Hellacious Acres (1991)
The Stranglers: All Twelve Inches (1992)Wayne's World: Motion Picture Soundtrack (1992)
Local H: Pack Up the Cats (1998)
Caroline's Spine: "Attention Please" (1999)
The Darkness: One Way Ticket to Hell... and Back (2005)
The Smashing Pumpkins: Zeitgeist (2007)
Transformers: "Motion Picture Soundtrack" (2007)
The Storm: Where The Storm Meets The Ground (2008)
The Smashing Pumpkins: American Gothic (2008)
Jimmy Chamberlin's This: "Great Civilization" (2010)
Maximilian Is King: Featuring Arthur Lynn and Nick Fowler "Songs To Kill Yourself With" (2012)
Yes: Heaven & Earth'' (2014)

See also
:Category:Albums produced by Roy Thomas Baker
:Category:Song recordings produced by Roy Thomas Baker

References

External links

Roy Thomas Baker – Flixster Movie Profile.

Roy Thomas Baker (RTB)'s Linked (IN) Professional Profile.
An Invitation to the Opera, Sound on Sound, October 1995 – interview with Baker
Mix interview with Roy Thomas Baker by Rick Clark, April 1, 1999.
Mix interview with Roy Thomas Baker by Paul Tingen, March 1, 2006.

1946 births
Living people
English record producers
People from Hampstead
English songwriters
English audio engineers
English music arrangers
Musicians from London
English expatriates in the United States